Streptostyla is a genus of predatory, air-breathing land snails, terrestrial pulmonate gastropod mollusks in the subfamily Streptostylinae of the family Spiraxidae. 

Streptostyla is the type genus of the subfamily Streptostylinae.

Distribution 
The distribution of the genus Streptostyla includes Mexico, Central America, Cuba and Venezuela.

Species
There are four subgenera in the genus Streptostyla. Species within the genus Streptostyla include:

Subgenus Streptostyla Shuttleworth, 1852

with oliviform shell
 Streptostyla clavatula Ancey, 1903
 Streptostyla cylindracea (Pfeiffer, 1846)
 Streptostyla gabbi Pilsbry, 1907
 Streptostyla irrigua (Shuttleworth, 1852)
 Streptostyla lattrei (Pfeiffer, 1845)
 Streptostyla novoleonis Pilsbry, 1899
 Streptostyla palmeri Dall, 1905
 Streptostyla potosiana Dall, 1905
 Streptostyla shuttleworthi (Pfeiffer, 1856)

with coniform shell
 Streptostyla conulus Von Martens, 1891
 Streptostyla gracilis Pilsbry, 1907
 Streptostyla streptostyla (Pfeiffer, 1846) - type species

with turgida shell
 Streptostyla chiriquiana Von Martens, 1901
 Streptostyla costaricensis Da Costa, 1904
 Streptostyla labida (Morelet, 1851)
 Streptostyla obesa Von Martens, 1891
 Streptostyla turgidula (Pfeiffer, 1856)
 Streptostyla nebulosa Dall, 1896
 Streptostyla sumichrasti Ancey, 1903
 Streptostyla vancegreenei Jacobson, 1966
 Streptostyla viridula Angas, 1879

with physaeform shell
 Streptostyla biconica Pfeiffer, 1856
 Streptostyla binneyana Crosse & Fischer 1869
 Streptostyla crassa Strebel, 1877
 Streptostyla delibuta (Morelet, 1851)
 Streptostyla flavescens (Shuttleworth, 1852)
 Streptostyla fulvida Crosse & Fischer, 1869
 Streptostyla glandiformis Crosse & Fischer, 1869
 Streptostyla oblonga (Pfeiffer, 1856)
 Streptostyla plicatula Strebel, 1977
 Streptostyla thomsoni Ancey, 1888
 Streptostyla valerioi Rehder, 1942
 Streptostyla ventricosula (Morelet, 1849)

with aplectiform shell
 Streptostyla boyeriana Crosse & Fischer, 1869
 Streptostyla dysoni (Pfeiffer, 1846)
 Streptostyla jacobsoni Pilsbry, 1951
 Streptostyla meridana (Morelet, 1849)
 Streptostyla propinqua Thompson, 1963
 Streptostyla sololensis Crosse & Fischer, 1869
 Streptostyla vexans Strebel, 1877

with subturrite shell
 Streptostyla mohriana (Pfeiffer, 1862)
 Streptostyla pilsbryi Richards, 1937
 Streptostyla sargi Crosse & Fischer, 1869

Subgenus Chersomitra Von Martens, 1860 includes six species:
 Streptostyla chiapensis Pilsbry, 1909
 Streptostyla limneiformis (Shuttleworth, 1852)
 Streptostyla lurida (Shuttleworth, 1852)
 Streptostyla mitraeformis (Shuttleworth, 1852)
 Streptostyla nigricans (Pfeiffer, 1845)
 Streptostyla physodes (Shuttleworth, 1852)

Subgenus Eustreptostyla H. B. Baker, 1927 includes five species:
 Streptostyla nicoleti (Shuttleworth, 1852)
 Streptostyla bartschi Dall, 1908
 Streptostyla jilitlana Dall, 1908
 Streptostyla toyuca Dall, 1908
 Streptostyla supracostata Pilsbry, 1910

Subgenus Peteniella Pilsbry, 1907 includes two species:
 Streptostyla catenata (Pfeiffer, 1856)
 Streptostyla ligulata (Morelet, 1849)

synonyms:
 Streptostyla bicolor E. von Martens, 1901: synonym of Pittieria bicolor (E. von Martens, 1901) (original combination)
 Streptostyla blandiana Crosse & P. Fischer, 1868: synonym of Streptostyla streptostyla coniformis (Shuttleworth, 1852)
 Streptostyla bocourti Crosse & P. Fischer, 1868: synonym of Streptostyla lurida (Shuttleworth, 1852)
 Streptostyla botteriana Crosse & P. Fischer, 1869: synonym of Streptostylella botteriana (Crosse & P. Fischer, 1869) (original combination)
 Streptostyla cingulata Crosse & P. Fischer, 1868: synonym of Streptostyla irrigua cingulata Crosse & P. Fischer, 1868 (original rank)
 Streptostyla cornea Crosse & P. Fischer, 1868: synonym of Streptostyla meridana cobanensis (Tristram, 1861)
 Streptostyla coxeni Richards, 1938: synonym of Myxastyla coxeni (Richards, 1938) (original combination)
 Streptostyla edwardsiana Crosse & P. Fischer, 1868: synonym of Streptostyla lattrei edwardsiana Crosse & P. Fischer, 1868 (original rank)
 Streptostyla flavescens S. I. da Costa, 1900: synonym of Streptostyla chiriquiana E. von Martens, 1901 (junior secondary homonym; S. chiriquiana is a replacement name)
 Streptostyla sallei Crosse & P. Fischer, 1868: synonym of Streptostyla lattrei sallei Crosse & P. Fischer, 1868 (original rank)
 Streptostyla sumichrasti Dautzenberg, 1908: synonym of Streptostyla sumichrasti Ancey, 1903 (homonym and synonym)
 Streptostyla tabiensis Pilsbry, 1891: synonym of Orizosoma tabiensis (Pilsbry, 1891) (unaccepted combination)
 Streptostyla wani Jaconson, 1968 is a synonym for Euglandina wani (Jacobson, 1968)

References

External links
 Baker, H. B. (1927). The type of Streptostpla Shuttleworth (Streptostyla). The Nautilus. 41(1): 21.

Spiraxidae
Taxonomy articles created by Polbot